Jiangbiao Zhi (江表志; "Treatises on Beyond the River") was a book written by Zheng Wenbao in 1010 during imperial China's Song Dynasty on the history of Southern Tang, a regime in the Five Dynasties and Ten Kingdoms period. Zheng had served Southern Tang, and after its conquest by Song in 976, served as grain transport manager in the northwestern region. Jiangbiao Zhi contains 3 chapters or scrolls.

References
 

Chinese history texts
11th-century history books
Song dynasty literature
Southern Tang
Treatises
11th-century Chinese books